Osmanthus Flowers Blooming Everywhere in August (八月桂花遍地开 bāyuè guìhuā biàndì kāi) is a Chinese Red Army folk song from Sichuan province, and is among the best-known revolutionary songs from the wartime and Maoist periods in China. 

The origin of the song is based on the tune Eight Pieces of Brocade (八段锦 bā duàn jĭn) from the Dabie Mountains. The revolutionary version of the song was popular at very high levels during the 1960s; Deputy secretary of defence General Tan Zheng's wife, captain Wang Changde, used to sing the song on his visits to the troops in the early 1960s, prior to his imprisonment during the Cultural Revolution. It was featured in the 1964 musical The East is Red, and is now regarded as one of the most popular “new” folk songs.

References

Songs about revolutions
Songs about flowers
Chinese songs
Chinese patriotic songs